Meelick may refer to the following places in the West of Ireland:

 Meelick, County Clare
 Meelick, County Mayo
 Meelick, County Galway